Hovedgård is a town in East Jutland with 2,253 inhabitants (2022), located in the Central Jutland Region, part of Horsens Municipality. The town is located in Ørridslev Parish. Previously, Hovedgård was a railway town between Skanderborg and Horsens. The name is pronounced "Hoved gård" (with emphasis on the last syllable as in "Ryom gård").

The town is in all probability named after the manor of Great Hovedgård which is close by. Inside the town you will find Tornbjerg Wood. A few kilometers to the southwest is Ørridslev church, which dates from the 12th century. Hovedgård has an active community and club environment and is particularly known for its music. Hovedgård School Orchestra celebrated its 50th anniversary in 2012.

The town is located 13 kilometers north of Horsens, 16 kilometers south of Skanderborg and 35 kilometers southwest of Aarhus.

History 
In 1682, the manor of Hovedgård consisted of two farms. The total cultivated area was 91.8 barrels of land owed to 18.89 barrels of hart grain. The railway station opened around 1868.

In 1879, the conditions are described as follows: " Great Hovegaard with brickworks and railway station... Hoved-Inn by the old Horsens-Aarhus Road".  In fact, the station was next to the inn. 

Around the turn of the century, the town is referred to as follows: " Hovedgaard- (Upper- and Lower), railway town next to the country road, with elementary school, Realskole (founded 1901), doctor's practice, brickworks, several merchants and craftsmen, inn, railway and telegraph and Post Office. "  Hovedgård had 387 inhabitants in 1906, 464 in 1911 and 485 inhabitants in 1916. 

During the interwar period and after World War II, Hovedgård's development was modest: in 1921 the town had 602 inhabitants, in 1930 689, in 1940 649, in 1950 610, in 1960 687 inhabitants  and in 1965 855 inhabitants.  

In 1930, the town had by occupation: 81 residents worked in agriculture, 273 in industry and crafts, 102 in trade, 65 in transport, 37 in business, 71 in housework, 48 were out of occupation and 12 had not provided information.

New railway between  Hovedgård and Hasselager 
A new, shorter high-speed railway line will be built between Aarhus station and Horsens via Hasselager and Hovedgård. The section will be 23–24 km long and thus reduce the current track length by approx. 6 kilometers to cut six minutes off travelling times. The project will cost 3.3 billion DKK and the final decision on alignment is expected to be completed in 2018.

Notes

Bibliography 

 Henrik Pedersen: Danish agricultural manufacturing on the basis of the preparatory work for Christian V.'s Land Registry 1688. Published after his death at the expense of the Carlsberg Foundation (København MCMXXVIII; Reprotryk for Landbohistorisk Selskab, København 1975), ISBN 87-7526-056-5

External links 

 Hovedgård Municipality

Coordinates on Wikidata
Municipal seats of the Central Denmark Region
Municipal seats of Denmark
Cities and towns in the Central Denmark Region
Horsens Municipality